Friedhelm Boginski (born 7 November 1955) is a German politician for the Free Democratic Party (FDP) who has been serving as a member of the Bundestag since 2021.

Early life and career
Boginski was born 1955 in the West German city of Bremen and became a teacher.

Political career
From 2006 to 2021, Boginski served as mayor of Eberswalde.

Boginski was elected to the Bundestag in 2021, representing the Uckermark – Barnim I district. In parliament, he has since been serving on the Committee on Education and Research.

In addition to his committee assignments, Boginski is part of the German-Portuguese Parliamentary Friendship Group.

Other activities
 Federal Agency for Civic Education (BPB), Member of the Board of Trustees (since 2022)

References 

Living people
1955 births
People from Bremen
Members of the Bundestag 2021–2025
21st-century German politicians
Free Democratic Party (Germany) politicians